Alfred Jack Cole (1925 – May 30, 1997) was a professor at the School of Computer Science, University of St. Andrews in Scotland. He is credited with building on the establishing of Computer Science at St Andrews.

Career 

Cole studied mathematics at University College London, completing his PhD on the theory of numbers in 1952. He then worked as a lecturer at Heriot-Watt College in Edinburgh until 1956, when he moved to Queen’s College, Dundee. His interest in the potential of computer technology resulted in a move to University of Leicester in 1962, as Director of the Computing Laboratory. In 1965 he returned to Scotland and St Andrews, as Director of the Computing Laboratory and Reader in Computational Science.

From 1965 Cole devoted his next twenty years to establishing computer science at St Andrews. His innovative approach included pioneering the teaching of Information Technology to Arts students. He developed techniques for space-filling curves to be used in video compression, leading to his invention of murray polygons. One applied use of murray polygons is the halftoning of rectangular images without using dithering or edge enhancement methods.

He initiated the Distinguished Lecture Series in 1969. This series kept costs lower than similar conferences, with the intention of exposing students and others to leading edge topics. Costs were reduced through industry sponsorship and support from the university's School of Computer Science.

Jack Cole Building 

To recognize his service, the school moved to the new Jack Cole Building in 2004.

Personal life 

Cole's interests included cats, hill walking, home brewing, folk music (and concertina playing), golf, gardening and football. He was a supporter of East Fife F.C.

Published works 

"The preparation of examination time-tables using a small-store computer", 1964
"Plane and Stereographic Projections of Convex Polyhedra from Minimal Information", 1966
"A note on peano polygons and gray codes", 1985
"Direct transformations between sets of integers and hilbert polygons", 1986
"Compaction Techniques for Raster Scan Graphics using Space-filling Curves", 1987

References

Alumni of University College London
Academics of the University of St Andrews
1997 deaths
1925 births